Jesús Rodríguez Ortuño (born 11 February 1998), commonly known as Echu, is a Spanish footballer who plays for Club Recreativo Granada as a left winger.

Club career
Born in Almuñécar, Granada, Andalusia, Echu joined Real Madrid's La Fábrica in 2016, from Málaga CF. On 17 July 2017, he was loaned to Segunda División B side CD El Ejido for one year.

Echu made his senior debut on 20 August 2017, coming on as a second-half substitute in a 0–0 away draw against FC Jumilla. He scored his first senior goal on 24 September 2017 by netting his team's second in a 5–1 home routing of CF Lorca Deportiva, and finished the season with four goals in 32 appearances.

On 16 July 2018, Echu joined Segunda División side CF Rayo Majadahonda also in a temporary deal. He made his professional debut on 13 September, starting in a 2–1 away defeat of UD Las Palmas, for the season's Copa del Rey.

On 20 July 2019, Echu moved to Granada CF, a club he already represented as a youth, and was assigned to the reserves in the third division.

References

External links
Real Madrid profile

1998 births
Living people
Footballers from Almuñécar
Spanish footballers
Association football wingers
Segunda División B players
Segunda Federación players
Real Madrid Castilla footballers
CF Rayo Majadahonda players
Club Recreativo Granada players